Mathematische Annalen (abbreviated as Math. Ann. or, formerly, Math. Annal.) is a German mathematical research journal founded in 1868 by Alfred Clebsch and Carl Neumann. Subsequent managing editors were Felix Klein, David Hilbert, Otto Blumenthal, Erich Hecke, Heinrich Behnke, Hans Grauert, Heinz Bauer, Herbert Amann, Jean-Pierre Bourguignon, Wolfgang Lück, and Nigel Hitchin. Currently, the managing editor of Mathematische Annalen is Thomas Schick.

Volumes 1–80 (1869–1919) were published by Teubner. Since 1920 (vol. 81), the journal has been published by Springer. In the late 1920s, under the editorship of Hilbert, the journal became embroiled in controversy over the participation of L. E. J. Brouwer on its editorial board, a spillover from the foundational Brouwer–Hilbert controversy. Between 1945 and 1947 the journal briefly ceased publication.

References

External links
Mathematische Annalen homepage at Springer
Mathematische Annalen archive (1869–1996) at GDZ [open access]
Mathematische Annalen archive (1869–1996) at DigiZeitschriften [open access]

Mathematics journals
Publications established in 1868